Mike Fuhrig (born 17 April 1965) is a German handball player. He competed in the men's tournament at the 1988 Summer Olympics.

References

External links
 

1965 births
Living people
German male handball players
Olympic handball players of East Germany
Handball players at the 1988 Summer Olympics
People from Erzgebirgskreis
Sportspeople from Saxony